Madhabananda Temple or Madhabananda Math is a temple  in Cuttack district of Odisha. This temple is famous for specially curing of cow's, dedicated to Mahapurush Madhabananda and located at Paga-Gopinathpur village (near Bahugram) of Salipur area in Cuttack district.

Location
It is nearest  from Chateshwar Temple . The nearest railway station is Kapilas Road Junction railway station ( away), Jagatpur Railway station ( away) and Cuttack Junction railway station ( away) and the nearest Airport is Biju Patnaik Airport, Bhubaneswar ( away).

References 

Hindu temples in Cuttack